Silvan Roger Gönitzer (born 29 August 1996) is a Swiss professional footballer who plays as a defender for FC Weesen.

Professional career
On 20 July 2017, Gönitzer signed his first professional contract with FC St. Gallen. He made his professional debut for St. Gallen in a 1–0 Swiss Super League win over FC Lugano on 16 August 2017.

On 31 January 2020, Gönitzer returned to Swiss amateur club FC Weesen, which he played for as a youth player.

References

External links
FCSG Profile

Kicker Profile
SFL Profile
 

Living people
1996 births
Sportspeople from the canton of Schwyz
Swiss men's footballers
Association football fullbacks
FC St. Gallen players
FC Rapperswil-Jona players
FC Schaffhausen players
Swiss Super League players
Swiss Challenge League players